Eleron Airlines is a Ukrainian cargo airline headquartered in Kyiv.

Destinations
Eleron Airlines offers chartered and scheduled cargo flights, as well as wet-leasing services. As of 2021, they operated mainly throughout Europe from their base in Lviv with few additional intercontinental services, e. g. to Hong Kong.

Fleet

As of May 2022, the Eleron Airlines fleet consists of the following aircraft:

See also
 List of airlines of Ukraine

References

External links
 

Airlines of Ukraine
Airlines established in 2012
Ukrainian companies established in 2012